The 1912–13 PCHA season was the second season of the professional men's ice hockey Pacific Coast Hockey Association. Season play ran from December 10, 1912, to March 18, 1913. Like the previous season, teams were to play a 16-game schedule, but one game was cancelled. The Victoria Senators were the PCHA champions. After the season the club played, and won, an exhibition series against the National Hockey Association champion Quebec Bulldogs.

Offseason
The Patricks signed Cyclone Taylor from the Ottawa Senators, replacing Newsy Lalonde who returned to the Montreal Canadiens. Taylor signed with the Vancouver Millionaires on November 19, 1912.

Regular season

The PCHA moved two games east of the Rockies, on March 17 in Calgary, Alberta, and on March 18 in Regina, Saskatchewan. The final game of the season, between Victoria and New Westminster was cancelled. Victoria won the championship and formally asked to play for the Stanley Cup, but was turned down due to the PCHA season ending several weeks later than the eastern leagues' season finished.

Highlights
On January 14, 1913, the PCHA held a speed skating competition among PCHA players. Ken Mallen was the victor, defeating Cyclone Taylor and Si Griffis. Griffis defeated Ernie Johnson to challenge Mallen.

Tommy Dunderdale won the overall scoring championship with 24 goals in 15 games. The top one-game performance was on March 17, when Eddie Oatman scored five goals in a game against Vancouver. On January 31, Lester Patrick, a defenseman, scored four goals in one game versus New Westminster.

The PCHA tried out NHA-style six-man hockey on February 15, in a game between New Westminster and Vancouver, but reverted to seven-man play for the rest of the season.

Final standings
Note: W = Wins, L = Losses, T = Ties, GF= Goals For, GA = Goals against

Results

a Played in Vancouver
b Played in Calgary
c Played in Regina
d Cancelled

A game between Victoria and New Westminster was cancelled at the end of the season.

Goaltending averages

Scoring leaders

See also
List of pre-NHL seasons
1912 in sports
1913 in sports

References

Bibliography

Notes

 
PCHA
Pacific Coast Hockey Association seasons